This is a list of 251 species in Peripsocus, a genus of stout barklice in the family Peripsocidae.

Peripsocus species

 Peripsocus acuminatus Turner, B. D. & Cheke, 1983 c g
 Peripsocus africanus Enderlein, 1902 c g
 Peripsocus alachuae Mockford, 1971 i c g b
 Peripsocus alboguttatus (Dalman, 1823) i c g
 Peripsocus ammonus Li, Fasheng, 2002 c g
 Peripsocus angolensis Smithers, Courtenay, 1959 c g
 Peripsocus annectens Li, Fasheng, 2002 c g
 Peripsocus annulatus Badonnel, 1967 c g
 Peripsocus anura Vaughan, Thornton & New, 1991 c g
 Peripsocus apicatus Cole, New & Thornton, 1989 c g
 Peripsocus apiculatus Li, Fasheng, 2002 c g
 Peripsocus attenuatus Li, Fasheng, 2002 c g
 Peripsocus australis Mockford, 1971 c g
 Peripsocus badimaculatus Li, Fasheng, 1993 c g
 Peripsocus baishanzuicus Li, Fasheng, 1995 c g
 Peripsocus baiyunshanicus Li, Fasheng, 2002 c g
 Peripsocus balli Badonnel, 1948 c g
 Peripsocus barunus Vaughan, Thornton & New, 1991 c g
 Peripsocus beijingensis Li, Fasheng, 2002 c g
 Peripsocus bhaktai Badonnel, 1981 c g
 Peripsocus biacanthus Li, Fasheng & Chikun Yang, 1988 c g
 Peripsocus bifasciarius Li, Fasheng, 2002 c g
 Peripsocus bifasciatus Schmidt, E. R. & Thornton, 1993 c g
 Peripsocus bifidus Thornton, 1984 c g
 Peripsocus bilobatus Broadhead & Alison Richards, 1980 c g
 Peripsocus bonnieae Thornton, 1990 c g
 Peripsocus brachyura Thornton & Wong, 1968 c g
 Peripsocus brinchangensis New & S. S. Lee, 1991 c g
 Peripsocus brunneus Datta, 1965 c g
 Peripsocus bucephalus Li, Fasheng, 1992 c g
 Peripsocus bucerus Li, Fasheng, 1992 c g
 Peripsocus bulbus Li, Fasheng, 2002 c g
 Peripsocus camerunus Badonnel, 1943 c g
 Peripsocus cassideus Li, Fasheng, 1999 c g
 Peripsocus caudatus Li, Fasheng, 1997 c g
 Peripsocus chamelanus Badonnel, 1986 c g
 Peripsocus changbaishanicus Li, Fasheng, 2002 c g
 Peripsocus chekei Turner, B. D., 1975 c g
 Peripsocus circinus Thornton & Wong, 1968 c g
 Peripsocus coccophagus Badonnel, 1935 c g
 Peripsocus cochleus Schmidt, E. R. & New, 2008 c g
 Peripsocus conoidalis Li, Fasheng, 2002 c g
 Peripsocus consobrinus Pearman, J. V., 1951 c g
 Peripsocus constrictus Thornton & Wong, 1968 c g
 Peripsocus corollaris Li, Fasheng, 2002 c g
 Peripsocus crassicosta New & S. S. Lee, 1991 c g
 Peripsocus crenulatus Thornton & Wong, 1968 c g
 Peripsocus curviclavus Broadhead & Alison Richards, 1980 c g
 Peripsocus cylindratus Li, Fasheng, 2002 c g
 Peripsocus decellei Badonnel, 1976 c g
 Peripsocus decurvatus Li, Fasheng, 1995 c g
 Peripsocus denticulatus Thornton & Wong, 1968 c g
 Peripsocus didymus Roesler, 1939 c g
 Peripsocus disdentus Li, Fasheng, 1997 c g
 Peripsocus dolichophallus Badonnel, 1986 c g
 Peripsocus dongbeiensis Li, Fasheng, 2002 c g
 Peripsocus duodecimidentus Li, Fasheng, 2002 c g
 Peripsocus elongatus New & Thornton, 1976 c g
 Peripsocus equispineus Li, Fasheng, 2002 c g
 Peripsocus exilis Li, Fasheng, 1997 c g
 Peripsocus falsipictus Li, Fasheng, 2002 c g
 Peripsocus ferrugineus Thornton & Wong, 1968 c g
 Peripsocus fici Smithers, Courtenay, 1984 c g
 Peripsocus forcipatus Li, Fasheng, 1993 c g
 Peripsocus forficatus Li, Fasheng, 2002 c g
 Peripsocus fornicalis Li, Fasheng, 1999 c g
 Peripsocus frimensis New & S. S. Lee, 1991 c g
 Peripsocus fulvescens Navás, 1920 c g
 Peripsocus furcellatus Li, Fasheng, 2002 c g
 Peripsocus ghesquierei Badonnel, 1948 c g
 Peripsocus golubae Lienhard, 2006 c g
 Peripsocus grandispineus Li, Fasheng, 2002 c g
 Peripsocus guandishanicus Li, Fasheng, 2002 c g
 Peripsocus guttulatus Badonnel, 1967 c g
 Peripsocus hainanensis Li, Fasheng, 2002 c g
 Peripsocus hamiltonae Smithers, Courtenay, 1977 c g
 Peripsocus haplacanthus Li, Fasheng, 1993 c g
 Peripsocus hedinianus Enderlein, 1934 c g
 Peripsocus helenae Lienhard, 2011 c g
 Peripsocus hickmani New, 1973 c g
 Peripsocus hinduensis Garcia Aldrete, 1999 c g
 Peripsocus hollowayi Smithers, Courtenay, 1984 c g
 Peripsocus hongkongensis Thornton & Wong, 1968 c g
 Peripsocus huashanensis Li, Fasheng, 2002 c g
 Peripsocus hutsoni New, 1977 c g
 Peripsocus hyalinus Enderlein, 1903 c g
 Peripsocus ignis Okamoto, 1910 c g
 Peripsocus incertus Badonnel, 1986 c g
 Peripsocus incoloratus Turner, B. D., 1975 c g
 Peripsocus inflatus Li, Fasheng, 2001 c g
 Peripsocus intricatus Smithers, Courtenay, 1964 c g
 Peripsocus jianfenglingicus Li, Fasheng, 2002 c g
 Peripsocus jiangxiensis Li, Fasheng, 2002 c g
 Peripsocus jilinicus Li, Fasheng, 2002 c g
 Peripsocus jinggangshanicus Li, Fasheng, 2002 c g
 Peripsocus jinshaanensis Li, Fasheng, 2002 c g
 Peripsocus jinxiuensis Li, Fasheng, 2002 c g
 Peripsocus juniperi Turner, B. D., 1975 c g
 Peripsocus kashmirensis Badonnel, 1981 c g
 Peripsocus keniensis Broadhead & Alison Richards, 1980 c g
 Peripsocus kunmingiensis Li, Fasheng, 2002 c g
 Peripsocus laoshanicus Li, Fasheng, 2002 c g
 Peripsocus laricis Li, Fasheng, 2002 c g
 Peripsocus latispineus Li, Fasheng, 2002 c g
 Peripsocus leptorrhizus Li, Fasheng, 1997 c g
 Peripsocus lifashengi Li, Fasheng, 2002 c g
 Peripsocus limi New & Thornton, 1976 c g
 Peripsocus longifurcus Li, Fasheng, 2002 c g
 Peripsocus longivalvus Badonnel, 1986 c g
 Peripsocus louguantaiensis Li, Fasheng, 2002 c g
 Peripsocus lunaris Li, Fasheng, 1993 c g
 Peripsocus luotongshanicus Li, Fasheng, 2002 c g
 Peripsocus machadoi Badonnel, 1955 c g
 Peripsocus macrosiphus Li, Fasheng, 1993 c g
 Peripsocus maculosus Mockford, 1971 i c g b
 Peripsocus madecassus Badonnel, 1967 c g
 Peripsocus madescens (Walsh, 1863) i c g b
 Peripsocus madidus (Hagen, 1861) i c g b
 Peripsocus magnimammus Li, Fasheng, 2002 c g
 Peripsocus maoricus (Tillyard, 1923) c g
 Peripsocus marginatus Turner, B. D. & Cheke, 1983 c g
 Peripsocus medifasciarius Li, Fasheng, 2002 c g
 Peripsocus medimacularis Li, Fasheng, 1995 c g
 Peripsocus medispineus Li, Fasheng, 2002 c g
 Peripsocus megalophus Li, Fasheng, 1995 c g
 Peripsocus melaleucae New, 1971 c g
 Peripsocus menieri Badonnel, 1984 c g
 Peripsocus meridionalis Li, Fasheng, 1999 c g
 Peripsocus microcheilius Li, Fasheng, 1993 c g
 Peripsocus microcheilus Li, Fasheng, 2002 c g
 Peripsocus milleri (Tillyard, 1923) i c g
 Peripsocus milloti Badonnel, 1969 c g
 Peripsocus mingshanicus Li, Fasheng, 1997 c g
 Peripsocus minimus Mockford, 1971 i c g b
 Peripsocus minutus Banks, N., 1924 c g
 Peripsocus mirabilis Li, Fasheng, 1995 c g
 Peripsocus mokotensis Badonnel, 1948 c g
 Peripsocus monticola Mockford, 1971 c g
 Peripsocus morulops (Tillyard, 1923) c g
 Peripsocus mutilatus Badonnel, 1986 c g
 Peripsocus nanjingensis Li, Fasheng, 2002 c g
 Peripsocus nanus Navás, 1922 c g
 Peripsocus nasutus Badonnel, 1976 c g
 Peripsocus nebulosus Navás, 1932 c g
 Peripsocus neglectus Mockford, 1996 c g
 Peripsocus nigrescens Williner, 1949 c g
 Peripsocus notialis Smithers, Courtenay, 1984 c g
 Peripsocus nubifer Mockford, 1991 c g
 Peripsocus octoidentus Li, Fasheng, 2002 c g
 Peripsocus oculatus Enderlein, 1926 c g
 Peripsocus oculimacularis Li, Fasheng, 2002 c g
 Peripsocus odontopetalus Li, Fasheng, 2002 c g
 Peripsocus oligodontus Li, Fasheng, 2002 c g
 Peripsocus optimalis Li, Fasheng, 1997 c g
 Peripsocus orbiculatus Li, Fasheng, 1993 c g
 Peripsocus orebius Li, Fasheng, 2002 c g
 Peripsocus orientalis Garcia Aldrete, 1999 c g
 Peripsocus oxydontus Li, Fasheng, 2002 c g
 Peripsocus pallidus Broadhead & Alison Richards, 1980 c g
 Peripsocus pamae Schmidt, E. R. & New, 2008 c g
 Peripsocus papillatus Cole, New & Thornton, 1989 c g
 Peripsocus parareicherti Cole, New & Thornton, 1989 c g
 Peripsocus paraspinosus New & S. S. Lee, 1991 c g
 Peripsocus parvulus Kolbe, 1880 c g
 Peripsocus parvus Li, Fasheng, 1995 c g
 Peripsocus pauliani Badonnel, 1949 i c g
 Peripsocus pediformis Li, Fasheng, 2001 c g
 Peripsocus pembanus Enderlein, 1908 c g
 Peripsocus peruanus Banks, N., 1920 c g
 Peripsocus phacellodomi New, 1972 c g
 Peripsocus phaeochilus Li, Fasheng, 2002 c g
 Peripsocus phaeopterus (Stephens, 1836) i c g
 Peripsocus pictus Thornton, 1962 c g
 Peripsocus placidus Mockford, 1991 c g
 Peripsocus plagiotropus Li, Fasheng, 2002 c g
 Peripsocus platyopterus Li, Fasheng, 1997 c g
 Peripsocus plstylpus Li, Fasheng, 1995 c g
 Peripsocus plurimaculatus Li, Fasheng, 1992 c g
 Peripsocus polygonalis Li, Fasheng, 1995 c g
 Peripsocus polyoacanthus Li, Fasheng, 1993 c g
 Peripsocus potosi Mockford, 1971 i c g
 Peripsocus pseudoquercicola Thornton, 1962 c g
 Peripsocus pumilus Enderlein, 1907 c g
 Peripsocus qingchengshanicus Li, Fasheng, 2002 c g
 Peripsocus qingdaoensis Li, Fasheng, 1993 c g
 Peripsocus quadratidentalis Li, Fasheng, 2002 c g
 Peripsocus quadratiprocessus Li, Fasheng, 1993 c g
 Peripsocus quadripunctatus Badonnel, 1955 c g
 Peripsocus quattuordecimus Li, Fasheng, 1995 c g
 Peripsocus quercicola Enderlein, 1906 c g
 Peripsocus reduncus Li, Fasheng, 2002 c g
 Peripsocus reflexibilis Li, Fasheng, 2002 c g
 Peripsocus reicherti Enderlein, 1903 c g
 Peripsocus rhombicus Li, Fasheng, 2002 c g
 Peripsocus rhomboacanthus Li, Fasheng, 2002 c g
 Peripsocus roseus Smithers, Courtenay, 1977 c g
 Peripsocus scalpratus Li, Fasheng, 2002 c g
 Peripsocus scapiformis Li, Fasheng, 2002 c g
 Peripsocus sclerotus Thornton & Wong, 1966 c g
 Peripsocus sedcimidentalis Li, Fasheng, 2002 c g
 Peripsocus sedecimidentalis Li, Fasheng, 1997 c g
 Peripsocus setosus Smithers, Courtenay, 1960 c g
 Peripsocus sexidentus Li, Fasheng, 2002 c g
 Peripsocus shilinensis Li, Fasheng, 2002 c g
 Peripsocus siculiformis Li, Fasheng, 2002 c g
 Peripsocus similis Enderlein, 1903 c g
 Peripsocus spinosus Thornton, 1959 c g
 Peripsocus spissospilus Li, Fasheng, 2001 c g
 Peripsocus stagnivagus Chapman, 1930 i c g b
 Peripsocus stegeri Thornton, 1990 c g
 Peripsocus stenopterus Thornton & Wong, 1968 c g
 Peripsocus stigmatus Thornton & Wong, 1968 c g
 Peripsocus stigmostigmus Li, Fasheng, 2002 c g
 Peripsocus stipiatus Li, Fasheng, 1993 c g
 Peripsocus subfasciatus (Rambur, 1842) i c g b
 Peripsocus subtilis Li, Fasheng, 2001 c g
 Peripsocus subtristis Mockford, 1991 c g
 Peripsocus suffitus Enderlein, 1903 c g
 Peripsocus suoxiyuicus Li, Fasheng, 2002 c g
 Peripsocus sydneyensis Enderlein, 1903 c g
 Peripsocus taipingensis New & S. S. Lee, 1991 c g
 Peripsocus terricolis Badonnel, 1986 c g
 Peripsocus teutonicus Mockford, 1971 c g
 Peripsocus tillyardi New, 1973 c g
 Peripsocus tinctus Cole, New & Thornton, 1989 c g
 Peripsocus togoensis Turner, B. D. & Cheke, 1983 c g
 Peripsocus transivenus Li, Fasheng, 2002 c g
 Peripsocus tredecimus Li, Fasheng, 1997 c g
 Peripsocus trigonoispineus Li, Fasheng, 2002 c g
 Peripsocus tristis Mockford, 1991 c g
 Peripsocus umbrosus Navás, 1911 c g
 Peripsocus uncinatus New, 1977 c g
 Peripsocus undecimidentus Li, Fasheng, 2002 c g
 Peripsocus undulatus Li, Fasheng, 2002 c g
 Peripsocus uniformis New & Thornton, 1976 c g
 Peripsocus vacoasensis Turner, B. D., 1976 c g
 Peripsocus valvulus Thornton & Wong, 1968 c g
 Peripsocus variatus Soehardjan & Hamann, 1959 c g
 Peripsocus varidentatus Li, Fasheng, 2002 c g
 Peripsocus vescus Li, Fasheng, 1997 c g
 Peripsocus viriosus Li, Fasheng, 1995 c g
 Peripsocus weinigeri Turner, B. D., 1975 c g
 Peripsocus wuhoi Li, Fasheng, 2002 c g
 Peripsocus wuyishanicus Li, Fasheng, 1999 c g
 Peripsocus xanthochilus Li, Fasheng, 2002 c g
 Peripsocus xihuensis Li, Fasheng, 2002 c g
 Peripsocus yongi New & S. S. Lee, 1991 c g
 Peripsocus yuleki Galil & Halperin, 1983 c g
 Peripsocus zhangispineus Li, Fasheng, 2002 c g
 Peripsocus zhangliani Li, Fasheng, 2002 c g
 Peripsocus ziguiensis Li, Fasheng, 1997 c g

Data sources: i = ITIS, c = Catalogue of Life, g = GBIF, b = Bugguide.net

References

Peripsocus
Articles created by Qbugbot